Wallendorf-Pont is a village in the commune of Reisdorf, in eastern Luxembourg.  , the town has a population of 83.

It is located on the Sauer river, on the border with Germany. It is connected to the German town of Wallendorf by a bridge.

External links 
 Visit Luxembourg

Reference List 

Villages in Luxembourg
Diekirch (canton)
Germany–Luxembourg border crossings